This is a list of municipalities created in Quebec on July 1, 1855. They are sorted by the County municipality they are issued from.
Municipalities written in bold still currently exist under the same name and status.

Beauharnois 
 Municipality of Dundee
 Municipality of Godmanchester
 Municipality of Ormstown
 Municipality of Russeltown
 Municipality of Saint-Anicet
 Parish of Saint-Clément
 Parish of Saint-Louis-de-Gonzague
 Parish of Saint-Stanislas-Kostka
 Parish of Saint-Thimothée
 Parish of Saint-Urbain-Premier
 Parish of Sainte-Cécile
 Parish of Sainte-Martine
 Township of Elgin
 Township of Hemmingford
 Township of Hinchinbrooke
 Unorganized territory of Beauharnois

Bellechasse 
 Parish of Beaumont
 Parish of Berthier-en-Bas
 Parish of Saint-Charles-Boromée
 Parish of Saint-François-de-Sales-de-la-Rivière-du-Sud
 Parish of Saint-Gervais-et-Saint-Protais
 Parish of Saint-Lazare
 Parish of Saint-Michel
 Parish of Saint-Vallier
 Unorganized territory of Bellechasse

Berthier 
 Municipality of Berthier-en-Haut
 Municipality of Bienheureux-Alphonse-de-Rodriguez
 Municipality of Saint-Félix-de-Valois
 Municipality of Sainte-Elizabeth
 Municipality of Sainte-Mélanie
 Parish of Conversion-de-Saint-Paul
 Parish of L'Isle-du-Pads
 Parish of Saint-Ambroise-de-Kildare
 Parish of Saint-Antoine-de-la-Valtrie
 Parish of Saint-Barthélemi
 Parish of Saint-Charles-Borromée-du-Village-d'Industrie
 Parish of Saint-Cuthbert
 Parish of Saint-Gabriel-de-Brandon
 Parish of Saint-Jean-de-Matha
 Parish of Saint-Joseph-de-Lanoraie
 Parish of Saint-Norbert
 Parish of Saint-Thomas
 Unorganized territory of Berthier

Bonaventure 
 Municipality of Shoolbred
 Township of Carleton
 Township of Cox
 Township of Hamilton
 Township of Hope
 Township of Mann
 Township of Maria
 Township of Matapédia
 Township of New Richmond
 Township of Port-Daniel
 Township of Ristigouche
 Unorganized territory of Bonaventure

Chambly 
 Parish of Boucherville
 Parish of Longueuil
 Parish of Saint-Bruno-de-Montarville
 Parish of Saint-Jean-l’Évangéliste
 Parish of Saint-Joseph-de-Chambly
 Parish of Saint-Luc
 Parish of Sainte-Marguerite-de-Blairfindie
 Unorganized territory of Chambly

Champlain 
 Parish of Batiscan
 Parish of Cap-de-la-Magdeleine
 Parish of Champlain
 Parish of Saint-Maurice
 Parish of Saint-Narcisse
 Parish of Saint-Prosper
 Parish of Saint-Stanislas-de-la-Rivière-des-Envies
 Parish of Sainte-Anne-de-la-Pérade
 Parish of Sainte-Geneviève
 Unorganized territory of Champlain

Dorchester 
 Municipality of Aubert-Gallion
 Municipality of Metschermet
 Parish of Notre-Dame-de-la-Victoire
 Parish of Pointe-Lévi
 Parish of Saint-Anselme
 Parish of Saint-Bernard
 Parish of Saint-Elzéar-de-Linière
 Parish of Saint-François
 Parish of Saint-Hémédine
 Parish of Saint-Henri
 Parish of Saint-Joseph-de-la-Beauce
 Parish of Saint-Isidore-de-Lauzon
 Parish of Saint-Jean-Chrysostôme
 Parish of Saint-Lambert-de-Lauzon
 Parish of Saint-Nicolas
 Parish of Saint-Romuald-d’Etchemin
 Parish of Sainte-Claire
 Parish of Sainte-Marguerite
 Parish of Sainte-Marie-de-la-Nouvelle-Beauce
 Township of Cranbourne
 Township of Frampton
 Unorganized territory of Dorchester

Drummond 
 Municipality of Aston
 Municipality of Blandford
 Municipality of Durham
 Municipality of Grantham
 Municipality of Kingsey
 Municipality of Upton
 Municipality of Warwick
 Parish of Saint-Christophe-d'Arthabaska
 Parish of Saint-Éphrem-d'Upton
 Parish of Saint-Norbert-d’Arthabaska
 Township of Acton
 Township of Bulstrode
 Township of Horton
 Township of Stanfold
 Township of Tingwick
 Township of Wickham
 Township of Wotton
 United Townships of Ham
 Unorganized territory of Drummond

Gaspé 
 Municipality of Baie-de-Gaspé-Nord
 Municipality of Baie-de-Gaspé-Sud
 Municipality of Grande-Rivière
 Municipality of Isles-de-la-Magdeleine
 Municipality of Newport
 Township of Cap-Rosier
 Township of Douglas
 Township of Fox
 Township of Malbay
 Township of Percé
 Unorganized territory of Gaspé

Huntingdon 
 Municipality of Caughnawaga
 Municipality of Lacolle
 Municipality of Laprairie
 Municipality of Saint-Édouard
 Municipality of Saint-Jacques-le-Mineur
 Parish of Saint-Constant
 Parish of Saint-Cyprien
 Parish of Saint-Isidore
 Parish of Saint-Joachim-de-Châteauguay
 Parish of Saint-Michel
 Parish of Saint-Patrice
 Parish of Saint-Philippe
 Parish of Saint-Rémi
 Parish of Saint-Valentin
 Parish of Sainte-Philomène
 Unorganized territory of Huntingdon

Kamouraska 
 Municipality of Mont-Carmel
 Municipality of Rivière-Ouelle
 Municipality of Sainte-Anne-de-la-Pocatière
 Parish of Kamouraska
 Parish of Saint-Alexandre
 Parish of Saint-André
 Parish of Saint-Denis-de-Kamouraska
 Parish of Saint-Paschal-de-Kamouraska
 Parish of Sainte-Hélène
 Unorganized territory of Kamouraska

Lac-des-Deux-Montagnes 
 Municipality of Argenteuil
 Municipality of Saint-Benoît
 Municipality of Saint-Colomban
 Municipality of Saint-Eustache
 Municipality of Saint-Hermas
 Municipality of Sainte-Scholastique
 Parish of Saint-Augustin
 Parish of Saint-Placide
 Parish of Saint-Raphaël-de-l’Isle-Bizard
 Township of Chatham
 Township of Gore
 Township of Grenville
 Township of Harrington
 Township of Wentworth
 Unorganized territory of Lac-des-Deux-Montagnes

Leinster 
 Municipality of L'Assomption
 Municipality of Lachenaie
 Municipality of Saint-Sulpice
 Parish of L’Épiphanie
 Parish of Repentigny
 Parish of Saint-Alexis
 Parish of Saint-Alphonse-de-Liguori
 Parish of Saint-Henri-de-Mascouche
 Parish of Saint-Jacques
 Parish of Saint-Lin-de-Lachenaye
 Parish of Saint-Ours-du-Saint-Esprit
 Parish of Saint-Roch
 Parish of Sainte-Julienne-de-Rawdon
 Township of Kilkenny
 Township of Rawdon
 Unorganized territory of Leinster

L'Islet 
 Municipality of Cap-Saint-Ignace
 Municipality of Islet
 Municipality of Port-Joli
 Municipality of Saint-Cyrille
 Municipality of Saint-Pierre-de-la-Rivière-du-Sud
 Municipality of Saint-Roch-des-Aulnets
 Parish of Saint-Thomas
 Unorganized territory of L'Islet

Lotbinière 
 Municipality of Lotbinière
 Parish of Saint-Antoine-de-Tilly
 Parish of Saint-Apollinaire
 Parish of Saint-Flavien
 Parish of Saint-Gilles
 Parish of Saint-Jean-Deschaillons
 Parish of Saint-Sylvestre-de-Beaurivage
 Parish of Sainte-Croix
 Unorganized territory of Lotbinière

Mégantic 
 Municipality of Broughton
 Municipality of Inverness
 Municipality of Lambton
 Municipality of Sainte-Julie-de-Somerset
 Parish of Saint-Calixte-de-Somerset
 Township of Aylmer
 Township of Forsyth
 Township of Halifax
 Township of Ireland
 Township of Leeds
 Township of Nelson
 Township of Tring
 Township of Wolfestown
 Unorganized territory of Mégantic

Missisquoi 
 Parish of Saint-Armand-Est
 Parish of Saint-Armand-Ouest
 Township of Dunham
 Township of Stanbridge
 Township of Sutton
 Unorganized territory of Missisquoi

Montmagny 
 Parish of Isle-aux-Grues
 Unorganized territory of Montmagny

Montmorenci 
 Municipality of Féréol
 Parish of Ange-Gardien
 Parish of Château-Richer
 Parish of Saint-François
 Parish of Saint-Jean
 Parish of Saint-Joachim
 Parish of Saint-Laurent
 Parish of Saint-Pierre
 Parish of Sainte-Anne-Côte-Beaupré
 Parish of Sainte-Famille
 Unorganized territory of Montmorenci

Montréal 
 Municipality of Bout-de-l'Isle
 Municipality of Pointe-Claire
 Municipality of Rivière-des-Prairies
 Parish of La Visitation-du-Sault-au-Récollet
 Parish of Lachine
 Parish of Longue-Pointe
 Parish of Montreal
 Parish of Pointe-aux-Trembles
 Parish of Saint-Laurent
 Parish of Sainte-Geneviève

Nicolet 
 Parish of Bécancour
 Parish of Saint-Édouard-de-Gentilly
 Parish of Saint-Grégoire-le-Grand
 Parish of Saint-Jean-Baptiste-de-Nicolet
 Parish of Saint-Pierre-les-Becquets
 Parish of Sainte-Gertrude
 Parish of Sainte-Monique
 Unorganized territory of Nicolet

Ottawa 
 Municipality of Buckingham
 Municipality of La Petite-Nation
 Municipality of Saint-André-Avellin
 Township of Bristol
 Township of Chichester
 Township of Clarendon
 Township of Eardley
 Township of Grand-Calumet
 Township of Hull
 Township of Île-Alumettes
 Township of Litchfield
 Township of Lochaber
 Township of Mansfield
 Township of Masham
 Township of Onslow
 Township of Sheen
 Township of Templeton
 Township of Wakefield
 Unorganized territory of Ottawa

Portneuf 
 Municipality of Cap-Santé
 Municipality of Deschambault
 Municipality of Grondines
 Municipality of Pointe-aux-Trembles
 Municipality of Saint-Bazile
 Parish of Saint-Augustin
 Parish of Saint-Casimir
 Parish of Saint-Jean-Baptiste-des-Écureuils
 Parish of Saint-Raymond-Nonnat
 Parish of Sainte-Catherine
 Unorganized territory of Portneuf

Québec 
 Municipality of Beauport
 Municipality of Stoneham
 Municipality of Valcartier
 Parish of Ancienne-Lorette
 Parish of Charlesbourg
 Parish of Notre-Dame-des-Anges
 Parish of Québec
 Parish of Saint-Ambroise
 Parish of Saint-Dunstan-du-Lac-de-Beauport
 Parish of Saint-Foye
 Parish of Saint-Roch
 Unorganized territory of Québec

Richelieu 
 Municipality of Saint-Ours
 Municipality of Sorel
 Parish of Saint-Aimé
 Parish of Saint-Barnabé
 Parish of Saint-Charles
 Parish of Saint-Denis
 Parish of Saint-Jude
 Parish of Saint-Marcel
 Parish of Sainte-Victoire
 Unorganized territory of Richelieu

Rimouski 
 Municipality of Isle-Verte
 Municipality of Kakonna
 Municipality of Matane
 Municipality of Métis
 Municipality of Rivière-du-Loup
 Municipality of Saint-Simon-de-la-Baie-Ha! Ha!
 Municipality of Trois-Pistoles
 Municipality of Viger
 Parish of Saint-Arsène
 Parish of Saint-Éloi
 Parish of Saint-Fabien
 Parish of Saint-Germain-de-Rimouski
 Parish of Sainte-Cécile-du-Bic
 Parish of Sainte-Flavie
 Parish of Sainte-Luce
 Township of Whitworth
 Unorganized territory of Rimouski

Rouville 
 Municipality of Saint-Jean-Baptiste
 Parish of Saint-Alexandre
 Parish of Saint-Athanase
 Parish of Saint-Georges
 Parish of Saint-Georges-de-Clarenceville
 Parish of Saint-Grégoire-le-Grand
 Parish of Saint-Hilaire
 Parish of Saint-Mathias
 Parish of Saint-Thomas-de-Foucault
 Parish of Sainte-Brigide-de-Monnoir
 Parish of Sainte-Marie-de-Monnoir
 Unorganized territory of Rouville

Saguenay 
 Municipality of Bagot
 Municipality of Chicoutimi
 Parish of Baie-Saint-Paul
 Parish of L’Assomption-de-la-Sainte-Vierge
 Parish of Petite-Rivière
 Parish of Saint-Etienne-de-Murray-Bay
 Parish of Saint-Irénée
 Parish of Saint-Louis-de-l’Isle-aux-Coudres
 Parish of Saint-Urbain
 Parish of Sainte-Agnès
 Township of Settrington
 Township of Tremblay
 Unorganized territory of Saguenay

Saint-Hyacinthe 
 Municipality of Abbotsford
 Municipality of Saint-Césaire
 Municipality of Saint-Simon
 Parish of La Présentation
 Parish of Saint-Ange-Gardien
 Parish of Saint-Damase
 Parish of Saint-Dominique
 Parish of Saint-Hugues
 Parish of Saint-Hyacinthe
 Parish of Saint-Pie
 Parish of Sainte-Hélène
 Parish of Sainte-Rosalie
 Unorganized territory of Saint-Hyacinthe

Saint-Maurice 
 Municipality of Maskinongé
 Municipality of Pointe-du-Lac
 Municipality of Rivière-du-Loup-en-Haut
 Municipality of Yamachiche
 Parish of Saint-Barnabé
 Parish of Saint-Léon-le-Grand
 Parish of Saint-Paulin
 Parish of Sainte-Ursule
 Parish of Trois-Rivières
 Township of Caxton
 Township of Shawenegan
 Unorganized territory of Saint-Maurice

Shefford 
 Municipality of North-Stukely
 Municipality of South-Stukely
 Township of Brome
 Township of Ely
 Township of Farnham-Est
 Township of Farnham-Ouest
 Township of Granby
 Township of Milton
 Township of Roxton
 Township of Shefford
 Unorganized territory of Shefford

Sherbrooke 
 Municipality of Bury
 Municipality of Dudswell
 Municipality of Eaton
 Township of Ascot
 Township of Brompton
 Township of Cleveland
 Township of Clifton
 Township of Compton
 Township of Hereford
 Township of Lingwick
 Township of Melbourne
 Township of Orford
 Township of Shipton
 Township of Stoke
 Township of Weedon
 Township of Windsor
 Township of Winslow
 United Townships of Newport-Ditton-Chesham-Clinton-et-Aukland
 Unorganized territory of Sherbrooke

Stanstead 
 Township of Barford
 Township of Barnston
 Township of Bolton
 Township of Hatley
 Township of Magog
 Township of Potton
 Township of Stanstead
 Unorganized territory of Stanstead

Terrebonne 
 Municipality of Lacorne
 Municipality of Mille-Isles
 Municipality of Saint-François-de-Sales-Isle-Jésus
 Municipality of Saint-Jérôme
 Municipality of Saint-Vincent-de-Paul
 Municipality of Terrebonne
 Parish of Saint-Janvier-de-Blainville
 Parish of Saint-Martin
 Parish of Sainte-Adèle
 Parish of Sainte-Anne-des-Plaines
 Parish of Sainte-Rose-de-Lima
 Parish of Sainte-Thérèse-de-Blainville
 Township of Abercrombie
 Township of Morin
 Unorganized territory of Terrebonne

Vaudreuil 
 Municipality of Newton
 Municipality of Nouvelle-Longueuil
 Municipality of Rigaud
 Municipality of Sainte-Marthe
 Municipality of Vaudreuil
 Parish of Saint-Clet
 Parish of Saint-Ignace-du-Coteau-du-Lac
 Parish of Saint-Joseph-de-Soulanges
 Parish of Saint-Zotique
 Parish of Sainte-Jeanne-Chantal-de-l'Isle-Perrot
 Unorganized territory of Vaudreuil

Verchères 
 Municipality of Contrecoeur
 Municipality of Saint-Antoine
 Municipality of Varennes
 Municipality of Verchères
 Parish of Saint-Marc
 Parish of Saint-Mathieu-de-Beloeil
 Parish of Sainte-Julie
 Unorganized territory of Verchères

Yamaska 
 Parish of Saint-Antoine-de-la-Baie-du-Febvre
 Parish of Saint-David
 Parish of Saint-François-du-Lac
 Parish of Saint-Michel-d'Yamaska
 Parish of Saint-Thomas-de-Pierreville
 Parish of Saint-Zéphirin-de-Courval
 Unorganized territory of Yamaska

External links and sources 
 Topos sur le Web
 Paroisses et municipalités de la région de Montréal au XIXe siècle, 1825-1861
 Les entités municipales et leurs maires

Local government in Quebec
Political history of Quebec

Municipalities Created
19th century in Quebec
1855 in Quebec